Pristilomatidae is a taxonomic family of air-breathing land snails, terrestrial gastropod mollusks in the superfamily Gastrodontoidea.

According to the 2005 taxonomy of the Gastropoda by Bouchet & Rocroi these snails belong to the "limacoid clade", and Vitreinae is a synonym for Pristilomatidae, although Vitreinae used to be a subfamily of Zonitidae. Family Pristilomatidae has no subfamilies (according to the taxonomy of the Gastropoda by Bouchet & Rocroi, 2005).

Distribution 
The distribution of Pristilomatidae includes the Nearctic, the western-Palearctic and eastern Palearctic, the Neotropical, Polynesia and Hawaii.

Genera
Genera within the family Pristilomatidae include:
 Coreovitrea Riedel, 1967
 Gollumia Riedel, 1988
 Gyralina Andreae, 1902
 Hawaiia Gude, 1911
 Lindbergia Riedel, 1959
 Pristiloma Ancey, 1887 - type genus of the family Pristilomatidae
 Spinophallus Riedel, 1962
 Troglovitrea Negrea & Riedel, 1968
 Taurinellushka Balashov, 2014
 Vitrea Fitzinger, 1833 - There are three subgenera in the genus Vitrea:
 subgenus Vitrea Fitzinger, 1833
 subgenus Subrimatus A. J. Wagner, 1907
 subgenus Crystallus R. T. Lowe, 1854
 Vermetum Wollaston, 1878

Cladogram 
The following cladogram shows the phylogenic relationships of this family to the other families within the limacoid clade:

References

External links 

 
Taxa named by Theodore Dru Alison Cockerell
Gastropod families